St Helen's Church, Kneeton is a Grade II listed parish church in the Church of England in Kneeton, Nottinghamshire, England.

History
The church was dates from the 14th century. It was restored and partly rebuilt by Ewan Christian between 1879 and 1890.

It is in a joint parish with St Peter's Church, East Bridgford.

Organ
The church contains an organ by Taylor of Leicester which was formerly in Wigston Magna Methodist Church, then Markfield Methodist Church, then Castle Donington Methodist Church and then the Bluecoat School, Nottingham.  It was installed here in 1978 by David Butterworth. A specification of the organ can be found on the National Pipe Organ Register.

References

14th-century church buildings in England
Church of England church buildings in Nottinghamshire
Grade II listed churches in Nottinghamshire